Maryland Bobcats FC, formerly World Class Premier Elite (WCPE), are an American soccer team and academy based in Montgomery County, Maryland, which was founded in 2016. The organization's professional team competes within the National Independent Soccer Association in the third division of U.S. Soccer. The Bobcats also field teams in both the Maryland Super Soccer League and Eastern Premier Soccer League.

History

Local and national amateur leagues
The club began as a men's amateur team as a way for friends to continue to stay in touch and for players to stay match fit when looking for potential professional playing opportunities. It went through name multiple name changes, settling on World Class Premier Elite as the club was gaining prominence. The club ended up having two men's teams playing in separate areas of the metro Washington D.C. area. WCP were the 2018 Spring Season champions in both the Washington Premier League (WPL) and Maryland Major Soccer League (MMSL). Both leagues are affiliated with the United States Adult Soccer Association (USASA).

In fall of 2018, World Class Premier took part in the 2019 U.S. Open Cup qualification tournament and reached the final round before falling to Virginia United FC in a shootout.

WCP were announced as the United Premier Soccer League's newest expansion into Maryland on November 30, 2018. The team competes in the Northeast Conference and plays its UPSL home games at Montgomery Blair High School's football stadium, in Silver Spring, Maryland in compliance with UPSL's Minimum Standards.

During the 2019 Spring season, the team went nearly undefeated in the Mid-Atlantic Division North (9-0-1) and finished the regular season in first place. It went on to win the Division playoffs, beating San Lee FC and eventually Baltimore United FC in the final. WCP fell to eventual champions Florida Tropics SC in the National Quarterfinals on July 13.

The following season, WCP (which later changed its name to Maryland Bobcats FC mid-season) finished the regular season undefeated. In the playoffs, the team won five straight games to win the UPSL's Mid-Atlantic Division, Northeast Conference, and eventually the Fall 2019 National Championship. The final, which was played at Barry University's Buccaneer Field in Miami Shores, Florida, saw the Bobcats defeat Santa Ana Winds FC, 3–1, in extra time.

On September 26, 2019, it was announced that the club would join the National Premier Soccer League as an expansion team. The Bobcats, originally accepted as WCP, were set to begin play in the Northeast Region's Mid-Atlantic Conference in 2020 with home matches being played at Montgomery Blair High School in Silver Spring, Maryland. However, in March 2020, the league announced the 2020 season was cancelled due to the COVID-19 pandemic.

In late 2019, the club announced it would be rebranding to Maryland Bobcats FC.

The club announced the a restructuring in the spring of 2020, which sees the Professional team on top, the Reserve Team (Maryland Bobcats FC II) underneath, and youth teams beneath the men's teams. The youth teams will have access to the men's teams and vice versa, and identified players will be brought up to potentially train and travel with the men's teams.

On August 6, 2020, Maryland Bobcats were announced as a new member of the Eastern Premier Soccer League.

Jump to professional play
In mid July 2020, the Bobcats were announced as a participant in the inaugural NISA Independent Cup, a regional tournament held by the National Independent Soccer Association, a USSF sanctioned Division 3 league, between its professional members and independent pro / amateur teams. The Bobcats were set the host the event's Mid-Atlantic Region which included FC Baltimore Christos, New Amsterdam FC, and the New York Cosmos at Maryland SoccerPlex before a surge in COVID-19 cases forced its postponement and relocation. Following multiple weather delays, the Bobcats won the Mid-Atlantic region on Saturday, October 10.

On July 27, 2020, the Bobcats announced it had applied to join NISA. If accepted, it would be the state's first professional outdoor soccer team since Crystal Palace Baltimore. Maryland was officially announced as a new league member on October 13, 2020 with plans to begin play in Fall 2021.

Colors and badge

Kit

Sponsorship

Players and staff

Current roster

Head coaches

General managers

Year-by-year

Honors

National Independent Soccer Association
NISA Independent Cup
 Mid-Atlantic Region
 Champion (1): 2020
United Premier Soccer League
National
 Champion (1): Fall 2019
Conference
Northeast Champion (1): Fall 2019
Division
 Mid-Atlantic 
 Regular Season (1): Spring 2019
 Playoffs (1): Spring 2019
 Beltway
 Regular Season (1): Fall 2019
 Playoffs (1): Fall 2019

References

External links
Maryland Bobcats FC website

2016 establishments in Maryland
National Independent Soccer Association teams
Association football clubs established in 2016
Montgomery County, Maryland